Aline Alaux (born 31 January 1813 – 12 October 1856) was a French painter.

Early life 
Alaux was born Marie-Rose Alaux in Bordeaux, to parents Jean-Paul Alaux and Marie-Anne Gué, known as Eugénie Gué. She married the painter Jean-Victor Bodinier in Bordeaux on 28 March 1848.

Career
Alaux participated in the Paris salons of 1833 to 1843, with the exception of 1839 and 1842. In 1850 she exhibited at the New York Historical Society. She painted mainly animals and birds.

Prizes 
She received a gold medal at the 1833 salon de Paris.

Collections 
 Musée du Louvre, Jeune fille dessinant
 Musée des Arts Décoratifs et du Design, Bordeaux : Étude de poisson - Perroquet au perchoir
 Château de Fontainebleau : Vue de l'église et du faubourg saint Eutrope à Saintes, (watercolour)
 Musée Alexandre Dumas : Auguste Caustre

Bibliography 
 Gérald Schurr, Les petits maîtres de la peinture 1820-1920, valeur de demain, t. VII, Paris, Les Éditions de l'Amateur, 1989

References

19th-century French women artists
19th-century French painters
1813 births
Artists from Bordeaux
1856 deaths